Takht-e Kabud (also Romanized as Takht-e Kabūd) is a village in Kushk Rural District, Abezhdan District, Andika County, Khuzestan Province, Iran. At the 2006 census, its population was 78, in 11 families.

References 

Populated places in Andika County